George Ernest Barnett (February 19, 1873 – June 17, 1938) was an American economist. He was a professor of economics at Johns Hopkins University from 1911 to 1938. In 1932, he served as president of the American Economic Association.

References

External links 
 
 

1873 births
1938 deaths
People from Cambridge, Maryland
Johns Hopkins University alumni
Randolph–Macon College alumni
Johns Hopkins University faculty
Presidents of the American Economic Association
Economists from Maryland